Antony Buss (born 1 September 1939 in Brightling, Sussex) is an English former cricketer active from 1958 to 1974 who played for Sussex. He appeared in 310 first-class matches as a righthanded batsman who bowled right arm fast medium. Mike Buss is his brother. He scored 4,415 runs with a highest score of 83 and took 958 wickets with a best performance of eight for 23.

Notes

1939 births
English cricketers
Sussex cricketers
Marylebone Cricket Club cricketers
Combined Services cricketers
Living people
People from Brightling
Marylebone Cricket Club President's XI cricketers